One Night of Love is a 2008 Russian historical telenovela TV series. It was first developed by Amedia, with Alexander Akopov as head producer. The novela has 60 episodes. It stars Svetlana Ivanova, Alexander Konstantinov, Aleksandr Filippenko, Irina Muravyova, Olga Ostroumova, Yelena Bondarchuk, Andrey Chernyshov, Viktor Verzhbitsky. "One night of love" was nominated for International Emmy in a "Best telenovela" category. It is the original television series.

Plot
Alexandra "Sasha" Zabelina (played by Svetlana Ivanova) is a young Russian aristocrat who lives on a small country estate with her father, Earl Illarion  Zabelin (played by Aleksandr Filippenko). Sasha's mother was brutally killed in front of her eyes at a young age. After the tragedy she decided to become brave and strong in order to protect herself. She grew up reading stories about Nadezda Durova - woman, who dressed up like a soldier and went to war.

10 years later, Alexandra became a very beautiful young lady. She is smart, brave and kind-hearted. Her father decides to move to Saint Petersburg and Sasha joins him. When they were waiting for horse-change, Sasha heard a conversation between two men, who plan to dethrone Tsar. She finds a strange list with numbers and names and takes it with her. Strangers try to stop Alexandra, but she manages to escape. When she tells the story to her father and nanny Anna, they don't believe her.

Meanwhile, a handsome and rich knyaz (title in Russian society) Mikhail "Misha" Voronzov (played by Alexander Konstantinov) returns to Saint Petersburg from Europe. He has been absent for 2 years because of the scandal with woman. Now tse-tsarevich Alexander asks him to investigate the case about prospective plot against Tsar.

When Sasha comes to Saint Petersburg the two strangers decide to kill her. So they sent a man who should stole "the list" from her. The men threatens her with a knife. And at this moment Mikhail Voronzov saves her life. That is how Alexandra and Mikhail meet. But Sasha tells Mikhail that she could protect herself without his help.

After that Sasha decides to take fencing lessons. But the teacher Mr.Sharl do not want to teach a girl. So Alexandra dresses up like a boy in order to take this lessons.

Alexandra and Mikhail meet again in weapon shop and...argue. But it is obvious that something happened between Sasha and Misha. And this is the beginning of their great love story.

References

External links
Official Website for One Night of Love 
 

STS (TV channel) original programming
2000s Russian television series
Russian television miniseries
Television series set in the 19th century
2008 Russian television series debuts
2008 Russian television series endings
Russian drama television series
Russian telenovelas
Cross-dressing in film